Mekupelet (sold in English-speaking markets as Chocolate Log) is a bar of thinly folded milk chocolate produced in Israel since 1935 by Elite, now a subdivision of the Strauss Group. The Hebrew name means "folded". It is known for its crumbliness and thin flakes and has been compared to the British chocolate bar known as Cadbury Flake.

Mekupelet is exported to overseas markets. Mekupelet is also produced in a 'Mehadrin' version through the Magadim factory of the Strauss Group.

History 
In 1992 the motto "down to the last crumb" was launched.

Variations
Several varieties of Mekupelet have been produced over the years, including:
 dark chocolate
 white chocolate
 mini-version
 extended length (XL)
 blue and white, to celebrate Israel's 55th year of existence

References

1935 establishments in Mandatory Palestine
Chocolate bars
Israeli confectionery